Habibullah Abdurazzaq (Tajik: Ҳабибуллоҳ Абдураззоқ) (7 November 1937 – 19 January 2021) was a Tajik actor and director of theater and cinema. He was a made a member of the Union of Cinematographers of the USSR in 1973.

References

Tajikistani actors
1937 births
2021 deaths